The men's singles of the 2008 ECM Prague Open tournament was played on clay in Prague, Czech Republic.

Dušan Lojda was the defending champion, but lost in first round to Augustin Gensse.

Jan Hernych won the title by defeating Lukáš Dlouhý 4–6, 6–2, 6–4 in the final.

Seeds

Draw

Finals

Top half

Bottom half

External Links
 Main Draw
 Qualifying Draw

2008 - Men's Singles
Prague Open